The 1979–80 Iowa State Cyclones men's basketball team represented Iowa State University during the 1979–80 NCAA Division I men's basketball season. The Cyclones were coached by Lynn Nance, who was in his fourth and final season with the Cyclones. They played their home games at Hilton Coliseum in Ames, Iowa. Nance resigned on January 29, 1980. Assistants Rick Samuels and Reggie Warford took over for the remainder of the season.

They finished the season 11–16, 5–9 in Big Eight play to finish in seventh place. The Cyclones lost in the first round of the Big Eight tournament to Kansas State, falling 101-87.

Roster

Schedule and results 

|-
!colspan=6 style=""|Regular Season

|-
!colspan=6 style=""|Big Eight tournament

|-

References 

Iowa State Cyclones men's basketball seasons
Iowa State
Iowa State Cyc
Iowa State Cyc